William Timothy Cotter (1866–1940) was an Irish-born  prelate who served as the third Roman Catholic Bishop of Portsmouth, England, from 1910 to 1940.

Life
William Timothy Cotter was born in Cloyne, County Cork, Ireland on 21 December 1866. He was educated at St. Colman's Fermoy; and studied for the priesthood at Maynooth College. Cotter was ordained to the priesthood on 19 June 1892 at Portsmouth. 

He was appointed an Auxiliary Bishop of Portsmouth and Titular Bishop of Clazomenae on 14 February 1905. His consecration to the Episcopate took place on 19 March 1905, the principal consecrator was Bishop John Baptist Cahill of Portsmouth, and the principal co-consecrators were Bishop George Ambrose Burton of Clifton and Bishop Peter Amigo of Southwark. Five years later, he was appointed Bishop of Portsmouth on 24 November 1910.

Bishop Cotter died in office on 24 October 1940, aged 73.

References 

1866 births
1940 deaths
Alumni of St Patrick's College, Maynooth
People from County Cork
Roman Catholic bishops of Portsmouth
Christianity in Hampshire
20th-century Roman Catholic bishops in England
People educated at St Colman's College, Fermoy
William